The Death of Jesus is a 2019 novel by J.M. Coetzee; it is the third in his "Jesus" trilogy, following The Childhood of Jesus (2013) and The Schooldays of Jesus (2016). It was first published in Spanish under the title La muerte de Jesús and distributed throughout Latin America. It is the second of Coetzee's books to appear first in Spanish, the first being Siete cuentos morales or "Moral Tales."

Prior to its publication, The Death of Jesus was cited in media across the world as one of the most anticipated novels of 2020 in the English-speaking world.

According to review aggregator Book Marks, the novel received positive critical response based on 24 reviews.

Reviews

 Evening Standard
 Financial Times
 The Guardian

References

2019 novels
21st-century South African novels
Novels by J. M. Coetzee
Spanish-language novels
Text Publishing books